John Howe may refer to:

Politics
John Howe (MP for Yarmouth)
 John Grobham Howe (died 1679) (1625–1679), British politician and MP for Gloucestershire
 John Grubham Howe (1657–1722), British politician
 Sir John Howe, 1st Baronet (died 1671), British politician and MP for Gloucestershire
 John Howe, 1st Baron Chedworth (died 1742), British MP for Gloucester and Wiltshire
 John Howe, 2nd Baron Chedworth (1714–1762), Lord Lieutenant of Gloucestershire
 John Howe, 4th Baron Chedworth (1754–1804), last Baron Chedworth
 John W. Howe (politician) (1801–1873), American politician from Pennsylvania
 John Howe (Minnesota politician) (born 1963), American politician from Minnesota

Religion
 John Howe (theologian) (1630–1705), English Puritan theologian
 John Howe (bishop) (1920–2001), Episcopal bishop of St Andrews, Dunkeld and Dunblane
 John W. Howe (bishop) (born 1942), bishop of the Episcopal Diocese of Central Florida

Other
 John Howe (loyalist) (1754–1835), American loyalist and printer
 John Howe (Australian settler) (1774–1852), Chief Constable of Windsor, New South Wales
 John Howe (cricketer) (1868–1939), Australian cricketer
 John Howe (RAF officer) (1930–2016), South African-born fighter pilot
 John Howe (illustrator) (born 1957), Canadian book illustrator
 John H. Howe (architect) (1913-1997), American architect
 John H. Howe (judge) (1801–1873), Chief Justice of the Wyoming Territorial Supreme Court
 John Ireland Howe, inventor and manufacturer
 John T. Howe (engineer), American mechanical engineer
 John Howe (filmmaker) (1926-2008), Canadian film director and producer

See also
Jack Howe (disambiguation)
Jackie Howe (1861–1920), Australian sheep shearer
Jonathan Howe (born 1935), retired four-star United States Navy Admiral